Kerry Matthew Stokes  (born John Patrick Alford on 13 September 1940) is an Australian businessman. He holds business interests in a diverse range of industries including electronic and print media, property, mining, and construction equipment.  He is most widely known as the chairman of the Seven Network, one of the largest broadcast repeating corporations in Australia.

Appointed an Officer of the Order of Australia (AO) in 1995, Stokes was appointed a Companion of the Order of Australia (AC) in 2006 in recognition of his contributions to Australian business, strategic leadership, promotion of corporate social responsibility, to the arts through philanthropy, and to the community, most especially those services supporting young people.

, Stokes was the thirteenth richest Australian by net worth, according to the 2021 Rich List.

Early life
John Patrick Alford was born in Melbourne, Victoria, Australia. His unmarried mother was Marie Jean Alford. Stokes was adopted by Matthew and Irene Stokes and grew up in Camp Pell, a slum housing area. He later dropped out of school at age 14. In June 2000, Stokes told the ABC, "My background was very difficult, very hard and I wouldn't wish that on anybody. I had lots of different occupations and obviously lots of different experiences. I had some time on the street, and sometimes, work was very difficult. Australia, in that period of time, wasn't a place where you could actually easily go and get a job, it was difficult, and we went where there was work available".

Career
Stokes' first reported job was to install television antennas in Perth, followed by a sustained period in property development throughout the 1960s and 1970s. He also developed a range of shopping centers in Perth and regional Western Australia with partners Jack Bendat and Kevin Merifield.

His private company, Australian Capital Equity, is the holding company for Stokes' interests in a diverse range of Australian and international businesses and ventures covering property, construction, mining and petroleum exploration.

He invested in the Caterpillar franchise in Western Australia (Wigmores Ltd) in 1988, and the company subsequently called WesTrac has equipment dealer franchises in Western Australia, New South Wales, the Australian Capital Territory and nine provinces across China, with the total number of employees close to 4,000 people, as well as 500 apprentices in Australia.

In 2007, Stokes' National Hire Group (over 50% owned by WesTrac) formed a joint venture with The Carlyle Group to acquire the equipment hire group Coates Hire.

Stokes has always had a keen interest in the pastoral industry and acquired the  Napier Downs station in the Kimberley, stocked with 20,000 head of Red Brahman cattle, from Peter Leutenegger in 2015 for an estimated 23 million to 40 million.

Media interests
Stokes's commercial interests in the media sector commenced in Western Australia, with the development of the Golden West Network, a regional television network based in Bunbury in partnership with Jack Bendat. In 1979 Stokes acquired Canberra's local TV station Seven Canberra, subsequently acquiring Seven Adelaide from Rupert Murdoch and won the third commercial station licence in Perth, as well as acquiring radio stations in Victoria (including 3DB (Melbourne) and 3GL (Geelong), South Australia and Western Australia, through a vehicle called BDC. These assets were sold to Frank Lowy in 1987.

In 1996 Stokes acquired a strategic 19 per cent stake in the Seven Network (now approximately 43 per cent), a network of commercial free-to-air television stations in Sydney, Melbourne, Brisbane and Adelaide, as well as regional Queensland and Perth. This was supported by Alan Jackson, who Stokes appointed him CEO of the company for a number of years. The platform, as well as a 33 per cent stake in Sky News Australia, reaches 98 per cent of Australians. Seven has also established a major magazine publishing business, Pacific Magazines, which accounts for more than 20 per cent of all magazines sold in Australia.

Also under Stokes's leadership, Seven has established a leading online venture, Yahoo!7, combining Yahoo!'s search and online capabilities with Seven's content and cross marketing. The successful joint venture is driving a range of online and IPTV businesses. Seven built and acquired several broadband businesses, including wireless broadband group Unwired (sold to Optus, and subsequently defunct), VOIP operator Engin (subsequently an independent business) and was the Australian licensee for TiVo, launched in 2008 and abandoned in 2014.

In 2006, Seven Network and KKR created a new joint venture, Seven Media Group, a multi-faceted media company combining a presence in broadcast television, magazine and online applications. West Australian Newspapers Ltd. merged with Seven to form Seven West Media in 2011.

Stokes's private company, in conjunction with Shanghai People's Press, is no longer running a business after five years in Shanghai. and a second joint venture in mobile television with the Oriental Pearl Group in Shanghai. Seven held the Australian broadcasting rights for the 2008 Summer Olympics in Beijing and provided the broadcast feeds for the swimming and diving events for the rest of the world. The International Olympic Committee awarded Seven the gold medal for its TV coverage of the Athens Summer Olympics in 2004.

Personal life
Stokes has been married four times. His first marriage was to Dorothy "Dot" Ebert, who is the mother of two of his children. In an interview with The Bulletin, it was implied that Stokes was estranged from his first family. His second marriage was to his receptionist, Denise, with whom he had two sons. Denise walked out of the marriage and went overseas, and Stokes became a single father. His third marriage was to Australian television actress Peta Toppano in 1992. This marriage lasted for three years. In 1996 he married his fourth wife, Christine Simpson née Parker, a newsreader for rival station Channel 10 when they first met. Stokes has three grandchildren.

Net worth 
, Forbes assessed Stokes' net worth as 2.90 billion. , the Australian Financial Review assessed Stokes' net worth as 7.18 billion, the thirteenth richest Australian; and he was one of ten Australians who have appeared in every Financial Review Rich List, or its predecessor, the BRW Rich 200, since it was first published in 1984.

Philanthropy
In 1995 Stokes was appointed an Officer of the Order of Australia (AO) for service to business and commerce to the arts and to the community. In 2008 Stokes was appointed a Companion of the Order of Australia (AC) for service to business and commerce through strategic leadership and promotion of corporate social responsibility, to the arts through executive roles and philanthropy, and to the community, particularly through contributions to organisations supporting youth. His passionate interest in art coincides with his long association with the National Gallery of Australia, where he served as chairman for several years and has made multimillion-dollar donations.

He has also been awarded the Rotary Paul Harris Fellow Award by Rotary International and holds a life membership of the Returned and Services League of Australia, on whose behalf Stokes has acquired three Victoria Crosses, as well as other medals. These medals have been added to the collection of the Australian War Memorial in Canberra. He now sits on the council of the War Memorial.

In November 2012, Stokes was named Western Australia's Australian of the Year for his extensive philanthropic contributions to Australian society. In 1994, Stokes delivered the Boyer Lectures, a series of five lectures broadcast annually on ABC radio. His series was entitled "Advance Australia Where?" on the topic of the Information Superhighway. He delivered the Andrew Olle Media Lecture in October 2001.

Victoria Cross
Stokes has taken an active role in preserving Australian ownership of significant military heritage; he has now purchased three Australian Victoria Cross medal sets, and a George Cross medal set. Stokes has purchased all four sets via auction from Bonhams & Goodman of Sydney, Australia. The first was the VC medal set of Captain Alfred John Shout, paying a world record price of 1.2 million on 24 July 2006. In the same auction, he purchased the GC medal set of Lieutenant Commander George Gosse for 180,000. On 28 November of the same year, Stokes purchased the VC set of Lance Corporal Bernard Gordon for A$478,000. He donated all three sets to the Australian War Memorial.

On 20 May 2008, Stokes, in conjunction with the South Australian Government, purchased the Victoria Cross medal set of Major Peter Badcoe for 480,000. The Badcoe medals were on public display in the South Australian Museum in Adelaide, and on tour in South Australia, for twelve months before going on display at the Australian War Memorial in Canberra.

Controversy
On 23 April 2020, during the global COVID-19 pandemic, Stokes and his wife, Christine Simpson, were granted quarantine within their own home after returning from a skiing trip in Colorado instead of in a hotel on medical grounds. However it was unclear why Simpson was also given an exemption to strict State and Federal laws at the time.

On the front page of The West Australian, a newspaper published by Stokes' Seven West Media group, Stokes commented on Australia's relationship with China. Stokes also warned if China cut off its trade the Australian dollar would plunge to 0.25 and make it even harder to pay off Australian debt.

References

Further reading

1940 births
Living people
Australian mass media owners
Companions of the Order of Australia
People from Perth, Western Australia
Australian billionaires
Australian book and manuscript collectors
20th-century Australian businesspeople
21st-century Australian businesspeople
People from Melbourne
Australian adoptees
Australian philanthropists